Doğan is both a masculine Turkish given name and a Turkish surname meaning Falcon. Notable people with the name include:

Given name
 Doğan Abukay, Turkish experimental physicist and academic
 Doğan Akhanlı (1957–2021) Turkish-German writer
 Doğan Babacan (1930–2018), Turkish football referee
 Doğan Cüceloğlu (1938–2021), Turkish psychologist and nonfiction writer
 Doğan Hancı (born 1970), Turkish para-archer
 Doğan Kuban (1926–2021), Turkish architecture historian and academic
 Dogan Mehmet (born 1990), British folk singer of Turkish Cypriot descent
 Doğan Öz (1934–1978), Turkish prosecutor assassinated during his investigation of the Turkish deep state
 Doğan Türkmen, Turkish diplomat

Middle name
 Gürbüz Doğan Ekşioğlu (born 1954), Turkish cartoonist and graphics designer
Hasan Doğan Piker (born 1991), Turkish-American political commentator and Twitch streamer
 Turgut Doğan Şahin (born 1988), Turkish footballer

Surname
 Ahmed Dogan (born 1954), Bulgarian politician of Turkish ethnicity
 Aydın Doğan (born 1936), Turkish billionaire media tycoon
 Aynur Doğan (born 1975), Kurdish singer and musician from Turkey   
 Bahar Doğan (born 1974), Turkish long-distance runner
 Çetin Doğan (born 1940), Turkish general
 Deniz Doğan (born 1979), German footballer of Turkish descent
 Duygu Doğan (born 2000), Turkish female rhythmic gymnast
 Fidan Doğan (1982–2013), Kurdish activist
 Furkan Doğan (1991–2010), Turkish-American civil activist
 Harun Doğan (born 1976), Turkish sport wrestler
 Hasan Doğan (1956–2008), 37th president of the Turkish Football Federation
 Hüseyin Doğan (born 1994), Dutch footballer of Turkish descent
 Hüzeyfe Doğan (born 1981), Turkish-German football player
 Mazlum Doğan (1956–1982), Kurdish separatist politician in Turkey
 Mehtap Doğan-Sızmaz (born 1978), Turkish female long-distance runner
 Mesut Doğan (born 1984), Turkish-Austrian futsal player
 Mustafa Doğan (born 1976), German footballer of Turkish descent
 Nedim Doğan (born 1943), Turkish football player
 Orhan Doğan (1955-2007), Turkish politician of Kurdish origin
 Selina Özuzun Doğan (born 1977), Armenian Turkish female lawyer and politician
 Vildan Doğan, Turkish female karateka
 Ziya Doğan (born 1961), Turkish football manager

Fictional characters
 Doğan Alp, fictional character in the Turkish TV series Diriliş: Ertuğrul

See also
 Doğan (disambiguation)
 Dugan, a surname

Turkish-language surnames
Turkish masculine given names